The Cheltenham Synagogue is a synagogue in Cheltenham noted for its Regency architecture. It is an independent congregation located in the town centre on Synagogue Lane, off St James's Square.

Nikolaus Pevsner judges that the Cheltenham Synagogue is one of the architecturally "best" non-Anglican ecclesiastical buildings in Britain. It is a Grade II* listed building; the listing calls it "An outstanding example of a small provincial English synagogue".

History
The congregation first met in about 1820 in a hired space at the St George's Place entrance to Manchester Walk. The cornerstone for the synagogue was laid on 25 July 1837. Founded when Cheltenham was a popular spa town, the synagogue declined with the town itself and closed in 1903. It reopened in 1939 to serve evacuees being rehoused from London, refugees from Nazi-occupied Europe and soldiers stationed in nearby bases, including a number of Americans.

Architecture
The elegant Regency building was designed by architect William Hill Knight (1837–9) who also designed the Cheltenham Public Library, now the Cheltenham Art Gallery and Museum and Montpellier Walk.

The synagogue's chaste, Regency facade features Doric pilasters and a pediment. The interior features a coffered saucer dome – a typically Regency feature. At the centre of the dome a lantern made by Nicholas Adam provides natural light. The Georgian Torah ark and bimah are reused elements of the London New Synagogue in Leadenhall Street, of 1761: that congregation was in the process of building a new building, dedicated in 1838. The cost of wagon freight from London was £86.

A number of unusual elements of the original furnishings survive. Among these are the original rattan upholstery of the pews and bimah seats, and the prayer boards. One board has the Yom Kippur prayers and the other has the prayer for the welfare of Queen Victoria. Victoria's name is superimposed over the names of previous British monarchs, the earliest of which is George II.

References

External links
 
 Cheltenham Hebrew Congregation on Jewish Communities and Records – UK (hosted by jewishgen.org).

Orthodox synagogues in England
Regency and Biedermeier synagogues
Synagogues completed in 1839
Buildings and structures in Cheltenham
Regency architecture in England
Religious buildings and structures in Gloucestershire
Grade II* listed religious buildings and structures
Grade II* listed buildings in Gloucestershire